Jiang / Chiang can be a Mandarin transliteration of one of several Chinese surnames:

Jiǎng (surname 蔣) (蔣), commonly spelled as Jiǎng, Chiang, Cheung, Jang, Chioh
Jiāng (surname 江) (江), commonly spelled as Jiāng, Chiang, Gong, Kong, Kang, Kiang
Jiāng (surname 姜) (姜), commonly spelled as Jiāng, Kang, Gang, Geung, Gung, Chiang, Keung, Keong, Kiang
強, commonly spelled as Jiàng, Gang, Geong, Geung, Khiang, Qiang, Chiang

Meanings of Du (杜)
 A type of wild rice, believed to be Zizania latifolia, also known as Manchurian wild rice
 An interchangeable term for "Jiang(奖)". To reward sb.
 A surname.

彊
Jiang, Qiang, Chiang, (彊/强) is a Chinese surname. It originated during the 26th century BC. It derived from the deity Yujiang who was revered as the god of Water in Ancient China. Yujiang's descendants were given the surname Jiang (疆). During the Zhou Dynasty, in the Lu (state), those with the surname Ji (姬) or of the family Gongsun Jiang (公孙强) took the surname Jiang (疆). It was also used as a given name.
in Former Qin, the name "Jiang Duan" (强端) became the Jiang (疆). Before this, the surname had been Fu (苻), indicating descent from "Fú Jiān" (苻堅).

Notable people named 彊/强
 Jiang Shigong, Chinese legal and political theorist

References

Chinese-language surnames
Multiple Chinese surnames